Leonce Kevine Andzouana (born 15 November 1982) is a Congolese former professional footballer who played as a centre-back.

Club career
Andzouana played with Brazzaville club Diables Noirs over three spells as well as for Golden Arrows of the Premier Soccer League in South Africa, and Dolisie club AC Léopards.

International career
In January 2014, coach Claude Leroy, invited him to be a part of the Congo squad for the 2014 African Nations Championship. The team was eliminated in the group stages after losing to Ghana, drawing with Libya and defeating Ethiopia.

Career statistics

References

Living people
1982 births
Sportspeople from Brazzaville
Republic of the Congo footballers
Republic of the Congo international footballers
Association football central defenders
2014 African Nations Championship players
Republic of the Congo A' international footballers
CSMD Diables Noirs players
Lamontville Golden Arrows F.C. players
AC Léopards players